Aimee Patricia Barrett-Theron (born 27 June 1987) is a South African rugby union former player, and currently a referee on South Africa's Premier Panel.

Playing career
She could play as a fullback, centre or fly-half and played in various forms of the game – 15-a-side rugby union, rugby sevens and touch rugby. Aside from rugby union, she works as a biokineticist.

She represented KwaZulu-Natal at domestic level between 2005 and 2008, and Western Province between 2009 and 2012. She also represented South Africa Women at Under-20 level in 2008, at senior level between 2008 and 2010 and for the sevens team between 2008 and 2012. Her records includes appearing at the 2010 Women's Rugby World Cup in England.

Refereeing
She also took up refereeing, joining the World Rugby Women's Sevens Series circuit and being included on the refereeing panel for the 2016 Olympic Games.
In December 2016, shortly before making her refereeing test debut for a 2017 World Cup qualifier between Japan and Fiji in Hong Kong, she was included on the South African Rugby Referees' Association's National B panel, becoming the first female referee in history to do so.

References

South African female rugby union players
Living people
1987 births
Sportspeople from Cape Town
Rugby union fly-halves
Rugby union centres
Rugby union fullbacks
South African rugby union referees
Female rugby union referees
SARU referees
South African women referees and umpires
Super Rugby referees
South Africa international women's rugby sevens players